Stephen Harding House is a historic home located at Sea Cliff in Nassau County, New York. It was built in 1878, and is a -story, rectangular balloon frame vernacular Queen Anne style cottage. It has three small one-story additions. It features a replacement front verandah with turned spindle supports and decorative frieze and railings and fishscale shingles on the gable ends.  The cottage was built during the period when Sea Cliff functioned as a Methodist camp.

It was listed on the National Register of Historic Places in 2011.

References

Houses on the National Register of Historic Places in New York (state)
Queen Anne architecture in New York (state)
Houses completed in 1878
Houses in Nassau County, New York
National Register of Historic Places in Nassau County, New York